Blade is a film and television franchise based on the Marvel Comics character of the same name, starring Wesley Snipes as Blade in the original trilogy, and Sticky Fingaz in the television series. The original trilogy was directed by Stephen Norrington, Guillermo del Toro and David S. Goyer, the latter of whom also wrote the films and served as a co-writer for the first and last two episodes of the television series. The original films and television series were distributed by New Line Cinema from 1998 to 2006.

The character was created in 1973 for Marvel Comics by writer Marv Wolfman and artist Gene Colan as a supporting character in the 1970s comic The Tomb of Dracula. In the comic, Blade's mother was bitten by a vampire while she was in labor with Blade, rendering him immune to being turned into a vampire; following the release of Blade; the character was retroactively made into a dhampir and redesigned to match his film counterpart. A reboot within the continuity of the Marvel Cinematic Universe (MCU) is expected to be released on September 6, 2024 as part of Phase Five of the MCU, with Mahershala Ali in the title role.

Films

Blade (1998)

Blade grows up to become a vampire hunter, swearing vengeance on the creatures that killed his mother. He teams up with a man called Whistler, a retired vampire hunter and weapons expert.

Meanwhile, in the urban underworld, a feud is started between "pure-blood" vampires and those who had been human, but were "turned". Blade becomes aware of this and investigates further, uncovering a plot to raise the blood god La Magra, something he must stop at all costs.

Blade II (2002)

A rare mutation has occurred within the vampire community. "Reapers" are vampires so consumed with an insatiable bloodlust that they prey on vampires as well as humans, transforming victims who are unlucky enough to survive into Reapers themselves. Now their quickly expanding population threatens the existence of vampires, and soon there won't be enough humans in the world to satisfy their bloodlust. Blade, Whistler and an armory expert named Scud are curiously summoned by the Shadow Council. The council reluctantly admits that they are in a dire situation and they require Blade's assistance. Blade then tenuously enters into an alliance with The Bloodpack, an elite team of vampires who were trained in all modes of combat to defeat Blade. They'll use their skills instead to help wipe out the Reaper threat. Blade's team and the Bloodpack are the only line of defense which can prevent the Reaper population from wiping out the vampire and human populations.

Blade: Trinity (2004)

In the final installment of the series, the vampires succeed in framing Blade for the killing of a human (who was in fact a familiar being used as bait). Blade, now in the public's eye and wanted by the FBI, is forced to join forces with the Nightstalkers, a human clan of vampire hunters. Blade, Hannibal King, and Abigail Whistler go after Danica Talos, who has succeeded in locating and resurrecting Drake, also known as Dracula, the first vampire and by far the most powerful. In order to stop him, Blade has to release a virus that will wipe out all vampires, but being a dhampir, he must face the possibility of also dying as a result.

Cancelled projects
In October 2008, Blade director Stephen Norrington was confirmed to be developing a prequel trilogy to Blade, featuring Stephen Dorff reprising his role as Deacon Frost. However, by August 2012, the film rights to Blade had reverted to Marvel Studios.

In October 2016, star of the Underworld film series Kate Beckinsale stated that a crossover film between the franchises had been discussed as a sequel to Blade: Trinity with Snipes returning, but was declined because Marvel Studios had plans to introduce the character into the Marvel Cinematic Universe.

Marvel Cinematic Universe
In May 2013, Marvel had a working script for a new Blade film. Snipes said in July 2015 that he hoped to reprise the role in any future film and had discussed this with Marvel. At the San Diego Comic-Con 2019 held in July, Marvel Studios announced Blade reboot set in the Marvel Cinematic Universe (MCU), with Mahershala Ali being cast as the title character. At San Diego Comic-Con 2022, held in July, Marvel Studios announced their Blade film's release date as November 3, 2023, but was subsequently delayed to September 6, 2024 due to a change in the film's director, taking over the original release date of Deadpool 3. The film is set to shoot in May 2023 at Trilith Studios in Fayetteville, Georgia.

Television

Blade: The Series (2006)

In 2006, Spike TV aired a thirteen-episode series set after the events of Blade: Trinity, with Sticky Fingaz portraying Blade, replacing Snipes. Goyer (who wrote the scripts for all three of the films and directed the third film) also created the series.

Cast and crew

Cast

Crew

Reception

Box office performance

Critical and public response

Music

Video games
 Blade – Based on Blade, released in 2000.
 Blade II – Based on Blade II, released in 2002.

References

External links
 

 
Action film franchises
Film series introduced in 1998
Film series based on Marvel Comics
Horror film franchises
Marvel Entertainment franchises
Neo-noir
New Line Cinema franchises